Embarras River may refer to:

Embarras River (Alberta), a river in Canada
Embarras River (Illinois), a river in the United States

See also
Embarrass River (disambiguation)